2037 Tripaxeptalis, provisional designation , is a stony Florian asteroid from the inner regions of the asteroid belt, approximately 6 kilometers in diameter.

It was discovered on 25 October 1973, by Swiss astronomer Paul Wild at Zimmerwald Observatory near Bern, Switzerland. The asteroid's constructed name "Tripaxeptalis" derives from a numbers game with the asteroids 679 Pax and 291 Alice.

Orbit and classification 

Tripaxeptalis is a member of the Flora family, one of the largest collisional populations of stony asteroids. It orbits the Sun in the inner main-belt at a distance of 2.0–2.6 AU once every 3 years and 6 months (1,276 days). Its orbit has an eccentricity of 0.13 and an inclination of 4° with respect to the ecliptic.

The body's observation arc begins with its official discovery observation at Zimmerwald.

Physical characteristics

Rotation period 

In January 2006, a rotational lightcurve of Tripaxeptalis was obtained from photometric observations by astronomer Adrián Galád at Modra Observatory in Slovakia. Lightcurve analysis gave a rotation period of 2.33 hours with a brightness variation of 0.10 magnitude. The ambiguous lightcurve gave an alternative period solution of 2.23 hours and an amplitude of 0.10.

Diameter and albedo 

According to the survey carried out by the NEOWISE mission of NASA's Wide-field Infrared Survey Explorer, Tripaxeptalis measures 5.956 kilometers in diameter and its surface has an albedo of 0.198. The Collaborative Asteroid Lightcurve Link assumes an albedo of 0.24 – derived from 8 Flora, the largest member and namesake of its family – and calculates a diameter of 6.21 kilometers based on an absolute magnitude of 13.2.

Naming 

This minor planet's constructed name "Tripaxeptalis" (tri–Pax–hepta–Alice) refers to the fact that its number, 2037, matches 3 × 679 Pax as well as 7 × 291 Alice. The approved naming citation was published by the Minor Planet Center on 1 June 1980.

References

External links 
 Asteroid Lightcurve Database (LCDB), query form (info )
 Dictionary of Minor Planet Names, Google books
 Asteroids and comets rotation curves, CdR – Observatoire de Genève, Raoul Behrend
 Discovery Circumstances: Numbered Minor Planets (1)-(5000) – Minor Planet Center
 
 

 

002037
Tripaxeptalis
Named minor planets
19731025